The Morozumi Range is a mountain range in Victoria Land, Antarctica, extending northwest–southeast for , with its northern elevations overlooking the convergence of Gressitt Glacier and Rennick Glacier. It was mapped by the United States Geological Survey from surveys and U.S. Navy air photos, 1960–63, and was named by the Advisory Committee on Antarctic Names for Henry M. Morozumi, an aurora scientist at South Pole Station in 1960, and Station Scientific Leader at Byrd Station in 1963.

Further reading 
 Gunter Faure, Teresa M. Mensing, The Transantarctic Mountains: Rocks, Ice, Meteorites and Water, P 113
 James G. Bockheim, The Soils of Antarctica, P 112
 Allen, Boyd III; Mayewski, Paul Andrew; Lyons, W. Berry; and Spencer, Mary Jo, Glaciochemical Studies and Estimated Net Mass Balances for Rennick Glacier Area, Antarctica, (1985). Earth Science Faculty Scholarship. 203 https://digitalcommons.library.umaine.edu/ers_facpub/203
 A B Pour, Y Park, M Hashim, and J K Hong, Regional geological mapping in Northern Victoria Land, Antarctica using multispectral remote sensing satellite data, IOP Conf. Series: Earth and Environmental Science 169 (2018) 012081 doi :10.1088/1755-1315/169/1/012081
 R. L. Oliver, P. R. James, J. B. Jago, Antarctic Earth Science, P 141
 Amin Beiranvand Pour, Yongcheol Park, Jong Kuk Hong and Mazlan Hashim, MAPPING GONDWANA-DERIVED TERRANE USING REMOTE SENSING SATELLITE DATA IN ANTARCTICA

External links 

 Morozumi Range on USGS website
 Morozumi Range on the Antarctica New Zealand Digital Asset Manager website
 Morozumi Range on SCAR website
 Morozumi Range area map
 Morozumi Range on mindat website
 Morozumi Range long term updated weather forecast

References 

Mountain ranges of Victoria Land
Pennell Coast